Cliff Lerner is an American entrepreneur, author and media personality. He is best known as the co-founder and former CEO of Snap Interactive, a software and social media company which created one of the first applications on Facebook. Snap Interactive creates online dating applications including, FirstMet.com (previously AreYouInterested) and, The Grade. Snap interactive went public in 2006.

Early life and education
Lerner grew up in Long Island, and lives in Manhattan, New York. He attended Cornell University where he received a B.S. in Applied Economics & Business Management in 2000.

Career
Lerner started at Lehman Brothers as an analyst in the equities division from 2000–2005. In 2005, he left Lehman to start eTwine Inc and launched an online dating site IamFreeTonight.com. Lerner served as president, chairman, and CEO of Snap Interactive from 2005 – 2016 before merging  with AVM Software (owners of Paltalk). Under his leadership, SNAP's revenue grew 4,412 percent from 2007 to 2011.

AreYouInterested
In 2007, Lerner launched the AreYouInterested (AYI) application on the Facebook platform. The website surpassed 10 million users within a year and became the top grossing app on iTunes App Store.

In 2007, eTwine Holdings, Inc., changed its name to Snap Interactive. In 2010, AreYouInterested surpassed 70 million users and was having over 50,000 users per day. In 2016, AreYouInterested was rebranded as FirstMet.com.

The Grade
In 2014, Snap launched The Grade, another dating app. The application gained attention from The Wall Street Journal and Vogue, was considered an alternative to Tinder.

Author
In 2017, Cliff published Explosive Growth – A Few Things I Learned Growing To 100 Million Users and Losing $78 Million. The book tells the story of Snap Interactive while teaching startups how to achieve faster growth. It became #1 best-seller on Amazon in the Public Relations category. The book was recognized as a Top 5 Business Book on Growth Hacking.

Honors
 In 2012, Lerner rang the Nasdaq Opening Bell.
 In 2012, Lerner was one of the finalists for the Ernst & Young Entrepreneur Of The Year Award.

References 

American businesspeople
Cornell University alumni
Living people
Year of birth missing (living people)